An aggregate fruit or etaerio is a fruit that develops from the merger of several ovaries that were separated in a single flower. In contrast, a simple fruit develops from one ovary, and a multiple fruit develops from multiple flowers. In languages other than English, the meanings of "aggregate" and "multiple" fruit are reversed, so that "aggregate" fruits merge several flowers. The differences in meaning are due to a reversal in the terminology by John Lindley, which has been followed by most English-language authors.

Not all flowers with multiple ovaries form aggregate fruit; the ovaries of some flowers do not become tightly joined to make a larger fruit. As a result, many fruits form which are commonly mistaken to be of the aggregate variety. Aggregate fruits may also be accessory fruits, in which parts of the flower other than the ovary become fleshy and form part of the fruit.

The individual parts of an aggregate fruit come in many forms. Common examples are:
 drupelets:
 Raspberry 
 Dewberry and blackberry, also an accessory fruit, with a fleshy receptacle
 achenes:
 Strawberry, also an accessory fruit, with a fleshy receptacle
 Ranunculus
 follicles:
 Magnolia
 samaras:
 Liriodendron tulipifera

The components of other aggregate fruit are more difficult to define. For example, sugar apple (Annona spp.) fruit are made up of individual berry-like pistils fused with the receptacle.

See also
 Multiple fruit, a structure formed from the ovaries of several flowers, that can resemble an aggregate fruit
 Compound fruit, a term sometimes used when it is not clear whether a fruit is an aggregate fruit, a multiple fruit, or a simple fruit formed from a compound ovary
 Accessory fruit,  a fruit in which some of the flesh is derived from tissue exterior to the carpel
 Carpel, the "building blocks" of the ovary

References

Fruit morphology